Bimbo is a fat, black and white cartoon pup created by Fleischer Studios. He is most well known for his role in the Betty Boop cartoon series, where he featured as Betty's main love interest. A precursor design of Bimbo, originally named Fitz, first appeared in the Out of the Inkwell series.

History
Bimbo was initially inspired by animation director Dick Huemer's work on Mutt and Jeff, who, when working on the Out of the Inkwell series, decided to give protagonist Koko the Clown a canine companion. Bimbo has the distinction of being the first known cartoon character in history to ever have fully animated dialogue, as seen in the 1926 short My Old Kentucky Home, where a prototypical Bimbo says "Follow the ball and join in, everybody!"

Bimbo later became the protagonist and star of Fleischer's Talkartoons series, positioned as a rival to Disney's Mickey Mouse, making his first named appearance as Bimbo in Hot Dog (1930), though Bimbo's design would not become standardized until around 1931. The name Bimbo was chosen because in the 1920s the word was mostly associated with men who liked to fight.

He starred in several famous cartoon shorts of the 1930s, most notably Swing You Sinners!, Minnie the Moocher and Bimbo's Initiation.

Bimbo became a less prominent character after his girlfriend Betty Boop gained unexpected stardom and popularity with fans, with the Talkartoons cartoon retooled to give her top billing as the Betty Boop series in 1932.

After Hays Code censorship rules began to strictly get enforced in 1934, Bimbo disappeared from future Fleischer cartoons of the era, due to the implications of an anthropomorphic dog dating a human girlfriend being considered too risqué.

Revival
About 56 years after his first absence from cartoons, Bimbo made a reappearance in 1989 as a major co-star in the TV special The Betty Boop Movie Mystery. Then in First Publishing's 1990 comic Betty Boop's Big Break with more of his original personality intact as a love interest of Betty. He has continued to appear in various Betty Boop merchandise since then and has been reestablished as a mainstay of the series.

In 2016, he appeared in Dynamite's Betty Boop comic mini-series as Betty's best friend with a secret crush on her.

Similarities in other media
In 1932, a character created by Walter Lantz Productions, a dog named Pooch the Pup appeared as the star of his own cartoon shorts. Pooch greatly resembled Bimbo's design; in 1933, Pooch was redesigned even further to look more reminiscent of his Betty Boop counterpart.

Partial filmography

References

Fleischer Studios series and characters
Television series by U.M. & M. TV Corporation
Anthropomorphic dogs
Male characters in animation
Film characters introduced in 1930
Fictional anthropomorphic characters
Comedy film characters